Haplocoelopsis is a monotypic plant genus in the family Sapindaceae. The sole species is Haplocoelopsis africana. It is found in Kenya, Tanzania, and possibly Angola.

References

Flora of Kenya
Flora of Tanzania
Data deficient plants
Monotypic Sapindaceae genera
Sapindaceae
Taxonomy articles created by Polbot